Yolanda (Arenas) Sabbatini is a Cuban actress who trained in dance and theater in Havana, Cuba.

Biography
Among her various credits in Cuba, Arenas participated in the theater group Prometeo (under the direction of Francisco Morín) for two years in the late 1950s, acting in Los novios and in the 1960 film Cuba '58.

In 1968 she went into exile in New York, where she performed with the Repertorio Español theater company. Arenas also did commercials and voiceover work. She currently resides in Miami, Florida.

Works or publications

Notes and references

External links
 The Yolanda Arenas papers are available at the Cuban Heritage Collection, University of Miami Libraries. This archival collection includes primarily photographs, clippings, and programs of theater productions in which Arenas has performed. It also contains scripts with annotations by Arenas, headshots, other portraits, and audio and video recordings.
 Creator page for Yolanda Arenas in the Cuban Theater Digital Archive.

Cuban stage actresses
Living people
Year of birth missing (living people)
Cuban emigrants to the United States
Exiles of the Cuban Revolution in the United States